The 2018–19 BFA Senior League was the 28th season of the BFA Senior League, the top division football competition in Bahamas. The season began on 21 October 2018 and ended on 7 April 2019. The season was followed by a four-team playoff, with the championship match on 28 April 2019. Dynamos defeated Cavalier to earn their first title.

Regular season
Teams play those of own division twice and of other division once.

Oceanic Division

Atlantic Division

Playoffs

Champions

References

BFA Senior League seasons
Bahamas
Senior League